The Philippines competed at the 2022 World Athletics Championships in Eugene, Oregon, United States, from 15–24 July 2022. The Philippines was represented by a lone athlete; pole vaulter Ernest Obiena.

Results
(q – qualified, NM – no mark, SB – season best)

Men
Obiena qualified for the final round as one of the twelve vaulters who cleared 5.75 meters in the qualification round. He cleared said height on his second attempt. He was part of Group B in the said round.

In the final, Obiena cleared 5.94 meters on his second attempt setting a new Asian record, surpassing his own record by a centimeter. The finish was enough for a bronze medal – the first ever for the Philippines in a World Atletics Championships. Obiena was able to clear the height after following the advice of his coach Vitaly Petrov to switch to a more flexible 5.25-meter stick which was bigger than his previous. He also tried clearing 6 meters but he failed to take off from the ground on all three attempts.

Obiena finished behind silver medalist Chris Nilsen of the United States who cleared an identical height but managed to do the same on his first, and gold medalist Armand Duplantis who set a new world record of 6.21 meters. 

Field events

References

Nations at the 2022 World Athletics Championships
World Championships in Athletics
2022